Vulcan Manufacturing Company was a brass era American automobile manufacturer based in Painesville, Ohio, founded in 1914.

Vulcan's first products were the Model 27 speedster and five-passenger tourer. They ran on a  wheelbase and had a  engine (3⅜×5-inch, 86×127 mm) and left-hand drive. The speedster was US$750, the tourer US$850, compared to US$650 for the high-volume Oldsmobile Runabout US$500 for Western's Gale Model A and Ford Model N, US$485 for a Brush Runabout, as low as $375 for the Black, and  US$250 for the Success.

The Vulcan Power Wagon truck was produced circa 1915, at least some under license by Driggs-Seabury, and was rated at three to seven tons depending on model.

Notes

Sources

See also
List of automobile manufacturers
List of defunct automobile manufacturers

Brass Era vehicles
Defunct motor vehicle manufacturers of the United States
Motor vehicle manufacturers based in Ohio
Cars introduced in 1914
Vehicle manufacturing companies established in 1914
1914 establishments in Ohio
Defunct manufacturing companies based in Ohio